Pearl Abyss is a South Korean video game developer and publisher, known for creating the cross-platform MMORPG Black Desert Online and the upcoming open world action adventure Crimson Desert.

History
The company was founded in September 2010 by Kim Daeil and Youn Jaemin, previously a developer with Hangame and NHN Gaming, and began development of Black Desert Online shortly after. Due to the success of the game, Pearl Abyss decided to take over publishing rights and publish the game themselves rather than partnering with a 3rd party publisher. The success of Black Desert Online led to the development of another game, Crimson Desert, which is set to be a single player action adventure game. CCP's development studios in Reykjavík, London, and Shanghai would continue under CCP Games, while the publishing and marketing functions of CCP would be integrated with Pearl Abyss.

In October 2020 Pearl Abyss establishes Vic Game Studio Co., Ltd. as a game development company to target the global market with high-quality graphics and with the goal of developing a trendy mobile RPG.
On December 20, 2021, Vic Game Studio announces Black Clover Mobile which makes it Pearl Abyss's first licensed game.

Games

References

External links 
 Official website

Video game development companies
Video game publishers
Video game companies of South Korea
Video game companies established in 2010
South Korean companies established in 2010